This is a chronological list of school shootings in the United States before the year 2000, including any school shootings that occurred at a K-12 public or private school, as well as at colleges and universities, and on school buses. Excluded from this list are the following:

 Incidents that occurred during wars
 Incidents that occurred as a result of police actions
 Murder-suicides by rejected suitors or estranged spouses
 Suicides or suicide attempts involving only one person.

Shootings by school staff, where the only victims are other employees, are covered at workplace killings. This list does not include the 1970 Kent State shootings, or bombings such as the Bath School disaster.

19th century

1840s 

 incident.

1850s 

 incidents.

1860s 

 incidents.

1870s 

 incidents.

1880s 

 incidents.

1890s 

 incidents.

Total incidents listed here in this section (19th century):
{{#expr: 
+
+
+
+
+
 }}

20th century

1900s 

 incidents.

1910s 

 incidents.

1920s 

 incidents.

1930s 

 incidents.

1940s 

 incidents.

1950s 

 incidents.

1960s 

 incidents.

1970s 

 incidents.

1980s 

 incidents.

1990s 

 incidents.

Total number of 20th century incidents listed here:
{{#expr: 
+
+
+
+
+
+
+
+
+
 }}

See also 
 List of school shootings in the United States by death toll
 List of school-related attacks
 Mass shootings in the United States
List of unsuccessful attacks related to schools

Notes

References

Bibliography

External links 
 School Safety Interim Study Committee – Indiana Legislative Services Agency (September 24, 2013)
 Federal Report Looks at Crime and Safety in Schools – Council for American Private Education (CAPE) (January 2015)
 Indicators of School Crime and Safety: 2014 – National Center for Education Statistics (July 9, 2015)
 Indicators of School Crime and Safety: 2014 – Council of State Governments Justice Center (July 15, 2015)
 Selected Findings from the Indicators of School Crime and Safety: 2014 – Center for Evidence-Based Crime Policy (CEBCP) Symposium (August 17, 2015)

School Shooting incidents.

United States crime-related lists
United States